Sidoryata is a rural locality (a village) in Vereshchaginsky District, Perm Krai, Russia.  The population was 87 as of 2010.

Geography 
Sidoryata is located 28 km west of Vereshchagino (the district's administrative centre) by road. Pyankovo is the nearest rural locality.

References 

Rural localities in Vereshchaginsky District